The 2000 Dwars door Vlaanderen was the 55th edition of the Dwars door Vlaanderen cycle race and was held on 22 March 2000. The race started and finished in Waregem. The race was won by Tristan Hoffman.

General classification

References

2000
2000 in road cycling
2000 in Belgian sport
March 2000 sports events in Europe